Nyunenga is a rural locality (a settlement) in Krasnopolyanskoye Rural Settlement, Nikolsky District, Vologda Oblast, Russia. The population was 128 as of 2010.

Geography 
Nyunenga is located 39 km west of Nikolsk (the district's administrative centre) by road. Polovinka is the nearest rural locality.

References 

Rural localities in Nikolsky District, Vologda Oblast